The 2015–16 season was the 105th season in Hajduk Split’s history and their twenty-fifth in the Prva HNL. Their 3rd place finish in the 2014–15 season means it was their 25th successive season playing in the Prva HNL.

First-team squad

Competitions

Overall record

Prva HNL

Table

Results summary

Results by round

Results by opponent

Source: 2015–16 Croatian First Football League article

Matches

Friendlies

Pre-season

On-season

Mid-season

Prva HNL

Source: HRnogomet.com

Croatian Cup

Source: HRnogomet.com

Europa League

First qualifying round

Second qualifying round

Third qualifying round

Play-off round 

Source: uefa.com

Player seasonal records
Competitive matches only. Updated to games played 14 May 2016.

Top scorers

Source: Competitive matches

Clean sheets

Source: Competitive matches

Disciplinary record
Includes all competitive matches. Players with 1 card or more included only.

Sources: Prva-HNL.hr, UEFA.com

Appearances and goals

Sources: Prva-HNL.hr, UEFA.com

Overview of statistics

Transfers

In

Total spending:  0 €

Out

Total income:  5,85 million €

Total expenditure:  5,85 million €

Promoted from youth squad

Loans in

Loans out

1 Loan was terminated on 7 February 2016

2 Loan was terminated on 15 February 2016

Sources: Glasilo Hrvatskog nogometnog saveza

Notes

References

2015-16
Croatian football clubs 2015–16 season
2015–16 UEFA Europa League participants seasons